Silver Lake State Park is an  state park located along NH Route 122 on the northern shore of Silver Lake in the town of Hollis, New Hampshire. The park offers swimming at a sandy beach with a bathhouse, picnicking, and playground equipment, and the rental of kayaks and paddle boats.

References

External links
Silver Lake State Park New Hampshire Department of Natural and Cultural Resources

State parks of New Hampshire
Parks in Hillsborough County, New Hampshire